Amir Hussain is an Iraqi Olympic boxer. He represented his country in the flyweight division at the 1988 Summer Olympics. He lost his first bout against Egypt's Gamal El-Komy.

1988 Olympic results
Below is the record of Amir Hussain, an Iraqi flyweight boxer who competed at the 1988 Seoul Olympics:

 Round of 64: lost to Gamal El-Komy (Egypt) by decision, 1-4

References

1961 births
Living people
Iraqi male boxers
Olympic boxers of Iraq
Boxers at the 1988 Summer Olympics
Flyweight boxers